Marinos Satsias is a retired Cypriot professional footballer who spent his entire 19-year career playing for APOEL in Cyprus.

Career
Satsias was a right-footed defensive midfielder. He made his debut for APOEL in 1995 at the age of seventeen. He was known for his passion and discipline in the game.

During his career with APOEL, Marinos won 8 Championships, 6 Cups, 8 Super Cups and appeared in three official 2009–10 UEFA Champions League group stage matches in APOEL's first UEFA Champions League participation. He also appeared in one 2011–12 UEFA Champions League match for APOEL (against Real Madrid at Santiago Bernabéu Stadium), in the club's surprising run to the quarter-finals of the competition.

In his last season (2013–14) as a player, APOEL's captain managed to lift all the season's trophies in Cyprus, the Cypriot League, the Cypriot Cup and the Cypriot Super Cup, retiring as a proud domestic treble winner.

References

External links

Marinos Satsias at Footballdatabase

1976 births
APOEL FC players
Cypriot footballers
Cyprus international footballers
Cypriot First Division players
Association football midfielders
Living people
Sportspeople from Nicosia